Joseph Vijay Chandrasekhar (born 22 June 1974), known professionally as Vijay, is an Indian actor and singer who works predominantly in Tamil cinema. He is among the highest paid actors in India. He has played the lead in 66 films and the International Business Times framed him as a "consistent performer". Referred to as "Thalapathy", Vijay has a significant following internationally. He has won several awards, including a South Indian International Movie Award.

Early life and family 
Vijay was born as Joseph Vijay Chandrasekhar in  a Tamil speaking family on 22 June 1974 in Madras (now Chennai), Tamil Nadu. His father S. A. Chandrasekhar is a Tamil film director and his mother Shoba Chandrasekhar is a playback singer and carnatic vocalist. His father is of Christian descent and his mother is Hindu. Vijay was baptised at the age of 12. Vijay had a sister, Vidhya, who died when she was two years old.

Initially attending Fathima Matriculation Higher Secondary School at Kodambakkam, Vijay later joined the Balalok Matriculation Higher Secondary School at Virugambakkam and went on to pursue a degree in Visual Communications from Loyola College. While studying, at the age of 18, he asked his father if "he would launch him".

Film career

1984–2003: Child actor and transition into lead roles 

At the age of 10, Vijay started his film career as a child actor in Vetri (1984), making his first paycheck of 500 rupees paid for by actor-and-producer P. S. Veerappa. He then performed as a child actor in films such as Kudumbam (1984), Vasantha Raagam (1986), Sattam Oru Vilayaattu (1987) and Ithu Engal Neethi (1988). He also performed in Naan Sigappu Manithan (1985) as a co-star to Rajinikanth, who was the lead actor.

Vijay started to play lead roles at the age of 18 starting with Naalaiya Theerpu (1992). Vijay then appeared in the films Sendhoorapandi, Rasigan, Deva and Coimbatore Mappillai. They were commercially successful, though not critically acclaimed.

In 1996, Vijay performed in the Vikraman-directed Poove Unakkaga, which he states gave him his "initial breaks" and caused his popularity to "reach great heights". In 1997, Vijay acted in Kaalamellam Kaathiruppen which received positive response from critics, and Love Today, which was applauded by audiences.

He also starred in the films Nerrukku Ner, Kadhalukku Mariyadhai, Ninaithen Vandhai, Priyamudan and Thulladha Manamum Thullum which released to positive reviews and were commercially successful. He then performed in Nilaave Vaa. This was followed by the films Endrendrum Kadhal, Nenjinile, and Minsara Kanna.

In 2000, he performed in Kannukkul Nilavu, which was Vijay's 25th critically successful film, alongside two commercially successful romance films, Kushi and Priyamaanavale. His next successful films were Friends, Badri and Shahjahan. In 2002, he starred in the action film Thamizhan alongside Hindi actress Priyanka Chopra. Later, he featured in the romantic film Youth and the action film Bagavathi.

Vijay began 2003 with the comedy film Vaseegara and the supernatural film Pudhiya Geethai.

2003–2011: Star status in Tamil cinema 
 
Following the action-romance flick Thirumalai in 2003, Ghilli, a film directed by S. Dharani and produced by A. M. Rathnam, was released. It co-starred Trisha and Prakash Raj with Vijay as the lead. Ghilli was the first Tamil film of all time to gross over 500 million, or 50 crore, in the domestic box office.  The film grossed nearly $500,000 in the Malaysian market. Ghilli also broke the record for the most people seeing a movie in the first week of its release, previously held by M. G. Ramachandran's Adimai Penn (1969). Ghilli received favourable reviews. The Hindu stated that "Vijay, the hero whom the masses today identify with, and Prakash Raj, the inimitable villain in tow, this flick, "Ghilli"...on a winning track".
Ghilli was followed by commercially successful films Madhurey and Thirupaachi in 2005. Later, Vijay starred in the commercially and critically successful films Sachein, Sivakasi and Pokkiri. Pokkiri was one of the highest-grossing films in his career at that time.

In late 2007, Vijay starred in the romantic thriller film Azhagiya Tamil Magan, where he played the role of the protagonist and antagonist at the same time. Azhagiya Tamil Magan collected $1.043 million overseas, a top grosser at overseas box offices in 2007. Screen Daily, a British magazine, reported that Azhagiya Tamil Magan had entered the top ten Asian films box office hit chart in Malaysia in 2007. Barring the commercially successful Vettaikaaran (2009), all of his subsequent releases from Azhagiya Tamil Magan, Kuruvi and Villu were average successes; all three films were more successful overseas. In 2009, Vijay became one of the highest paid actors in South India. In 2010, he acted in the action comedy film Sura, which was a box office failure. Sura was Vijay's 50th film as a lead actor.

In early 2011, Vijay joined up with director Siddique for the romantic comedy Kaavalan. It received positive responses from both viewers and critics, with a box office collection of 102 crore worldwide. Kaavalan was screened at the Shanghai International Film Festival in China. Kaavalan was a commercial success in China. During Diwali the same year, his next film, the action film Velayudham, directed by M. Raja and produced by Venu Ravichandran, was released. Velayudham became one of the top-grossing films of 2011. Velayudham was a critical success among Japanese audiences.

2012–present: Increased critical and commercial success globally 

Vijay's next release in 2012 was Nanban. Nanban was screened at the Melbourne International Film Festival in Australia. Vijay's performance in the film received critical acclaim. Nanban went on to have a 100-day theatrical run. The Indian Express reported the film Nanban grossed 150 crore at the box office. The action thriller Thuppakki, directed by A. R. Murugadoss and produced by S. Dhanu, was released on Diwali 2012 to positive reviews. The film became the third Tamil film to enter the 1 billion club domestically. Thuppakki became the highest-grossing film of Vijay's career at the time, and the first of his films to gross over 1,800,000,000. Thuppakki was screened at the Russian film festival.  His next film Thalaivaa, directed by A. L. Vijay, was released on 9 August 2013 worldwide to mixed reports, and had a delayed release in Tamil Nadu. Thalaivaa was overall a box office failure.
The film Jilla released in 2014 and ended up as a box office hit. Vijay again worked with AR Murugadoss in the action thriller Kaththi. The film released to critical acclaim. The Los Angeles Times called Kaththi a "success in style". Kaththi collected 130 crore at the box office. It was the second-highest-grossing Tamil film of 2014.
 
In 2015, the fairy tale fantasy film Puli was released, directed by Chimbu Deven. Puli received mixed reviews from critics, though Vijay was praised for venturing into a new genre. Puli was one of the highest-grossing films of 2015 in its entire run. The film's satellite rights and distribution rights were sold for 100 crore. Since director Deven is a cartoonist, the film's half-demon theme was partially based on Japanese hit anime manga series Inuyasha, similar to which, Vijay played a "Tiger-demon" with tiger's teeth and blue eyes. The Sydney Morning Herald stated Vijay excels as a "Tiger-demon" in the film. IB Times reported Puli was successful in foreign markets and is regarded as one of the Indian films that took the standard to an international level.

The action-thriller Theri directed by Atlee was released in April 2016 to mixed reviews from critics and audiences, with one reviewer criticizing the actor's performance and the "predictable" storyline. It was the second-highest-grossing Tamil film of 2016 and Vijay's second film to gross over 1,710,000,000. In 2017, the masala film Bairavaa was released. It received mixed reviews and it collected 115 crore at the box office.

His 61st film, the action thriller Mersal, was directed by Atlee and released Diwali of 2017. It was both a critical and commercial success, becoming the first of Vijay's films to gross over 2.5 billion. The film was also released in Japan in the cities of Tokyo, Ebina, Osaka and Nakaya. For his role in Mersal, Vijay was nominated for Best Actor at the National Film Awards UK in 2018. The film won the Best Foreign Language Film award at the same event. The film was Vijay's third film to be released in China after Kaavalan (2011) and Puli (2015). The film was also screened at the Bucheon International Fantastic Film Festival in South Korea.

In 2018 the political film Sarkar was released with Vijay in the lead role, directed by AR Murugadoss. Keerthi Suresh played the female supporting role, it being her second collaboration with Vijay after Bairavaa. Following its release on Diwali 2018, Sarkar broke several collection records and entered the 100 Crore Club within two days. The Hollywood Reporter mentioned Vijay as a man with "swag" in the film. Sarkar was his second film to gross over 2.5 billion. Sarkar was released in Spain and screened in France and Japan.

Bigil was released in 2019, directed by Atlee, is a football action film. Vijay underwent "special training" for his role in the film. Bigil was Vijay's last film of the decade. Bigil received mixed reviews from critics, but Vijay was praised for the portrayal of his characters within the film. It was a commercial success, collecting more than 300 crore, became both the highest-grossing Tamil film of 2019—within three months of its release—and the highest-grossing film of Vijay's career. Bigil was also the first Tamil film released in Egypt and Jordan. In 2020, Bigil was the first Tamil film re-released in Germany.

During the same year, Lokesh Kanagaraj was selected as the director of Vijay's film Master produced by Xavier Britto. Master was originally scheduled to be released on 9 April 2020, however, it was postponed due to the COVID-19 pandemic. It was released on 13 January 2021 in theatres. Master was the highest-grossing film in United Arab Emirates (UAE) with a box office collection of $1.4 million within two days, surpassing the Hollywood releases Wonder Woman 1984 and Tenet within the same country. It was the first Indian film to periodically hold the number one spot globally for its year. The film was screened at the International film festival of Alberta, Canada. Upon release, it received both mixed to positive reviews from viewers and critics. Eastern Eye, a British magazine, called Master "an entertaining massy action film" but stated that "the runtime is a bit long". The film collected 300 crore worldwide and it was declared as a box office hit. The combined gross earnings of Mersal, Sarkar, Bigil and Master was determined to be over 1000 crore according to trade analysts. The dark comedy action film Beast released theatrically on 13 April 2022 worldwide. Beast received mixed reviews from critics. Roger Ebert, an American film critic website, reviewed the film Beast with 3/5 stars and called "Vijay as a multifaced tiger with a multifaceted avatar". Beast was the highest grossing Tamil film in US premiere shows. Beast made box office collection records in the international markets of New Zealand, Australia and Singapore. The film was commercially successful, collecting 250 crore worldwide, and was one of the most viewed films on Netflix globally in 2022. It was the first Tamil film released theatrically in Uzbekistan.

The action drama film Varisu was produced by Telugu film producer Dil Raju and directed by Vamshi Paidipally. Thaman S composed music and background score for the film. Varisu released theatrically worldwide on 11 January 2023 to polarizing reviews. Varisu collected 300 crore at the box office.

His upcoming project, Leo is directed by Lokesh Kanagaraj, in his second collaboration with Vijay. It is scheduled to release on 19 October 2023 in theatres worldwide. The film's soundtrack was composed by Anirudh, in his fourth collaboration with Vijay. Leo will release in Tamil, Hindi, Telugu and Kannada.

His 68th film will be a science-fiction directed by Pradeep Ranganathan.

Personal life 
 
Vijay married Sangeetha Sornalingam, a Sri Lankan Tamil whom he met in the United Kingdom, on 25 August 1999. They have two children. Vijay's son made a cameo appearance with his father in Vettaikaaran (2009) and his daughter portrayed a small role as her father's pre-teen daughter in Theri (2016). 

On 5 February 2020, the Income Tax Department raided Vijay's residence in Chennai and inquired about potential tax evasion, making note of his investment in immovable properties, which he inherited from the production studio AGS Entertainment. It was reported that Vijay and AGS Entertainment producer Anbu Cheliyan were suspected of undisclosed payments and alleged tax fraud. Nearly 65 crore was seized by the officials from Cheliyan's residence. The investigation took place while Vijay was shooting for his film Master in Cuddalore. On 12 March, officials stated that nothing significant was found during the raid. Opponents of the Bharatiya Janata Party accused them of politically targeting Vijay through such raids because he was critical of the them on demonetization and Goods and Services Tax (India) in the film Mersal.

On 13 July 2021, the Madras High Court dismissed a writ petition filed by Vijay in 2012 seeking exemption of the Entry Tax for his Rolls-Royce Ghost car that was imported from England. It imposed a fine of ₹1 lakh which was allotted to the Tamil Nadu Chief Minister's Public COVID relief fund. Justice S.M. Subramaniam said that Vijay's fan base considers him as a hero and he was expected to be one instead of a "reel" hero, further calling it an anti-national habit. On 15 July 2021, Vijay filed an appeal against defamatory statements made by the judge against him in Madras High court. On 20 July 2021, Vijay's appeal against the tax exemption case issue and defamatory statements was moved to a different tax bench sector of the court. On 27 July 2021, a two-judge bench of Madras High court stayed the earlier passed order by Judge S.M. Subramaniam that included the critical remarks and also stayed the order of a ₹1 lakh fine amount. On 25 January 2022, the court dismissed and removed the defamatory critical statements made by Judge S.M. Subramaniam against Vijay. On 15 July 2022, the court declared that no fine should be imposed on the car imported by since he had paid the full entry tax before January 2019, closing out the case in the process.

Wealth 
As of 2021, Vijay's net worth is 4200 million or 420 crore. Vijay earned a 100 crore salary for Beast, and also earned an estimated 120 crore—150 crore for Varisu, marking him among the highest paid Indian actors.

Artistry and honours 

Vijay's wax figures were unveiled in several parts of India, especially in Kanyakumari Museum. The Arabic Kuthu music dance video from the film Beast garnered 20 million views in 1 day. The song "Ranjithame" from Varisu was well received in Pakistan and Bangladesh.

News 18 describes Vijay as a "versatile actor" and a "fantastic playback singer, dancer and philanthropist". Odisha TV reported that "While fans are crazy for [Vijay's] movies, he has a set of dedicated audience who enjoy his dance moves". Zee media reported that Vijay amazed audiences with his acting and screen presence.

The Times of India labelled Vijay's dance moves in his film songs as "energetic and effortless".

Vijay received an honorary doctorate from the Dr. M.G.R. Educational and Research Institute in 2007 in honour of his achievements in the film industry. Vijay was awarded the 'Best International Actor of 2018' in the United Kingdom for Mersal.

See also
 List of dancers

Further reading

References

External links 

 
 

 
1974 births
Living people
People from Tamil Nadu
21st-century Indian male actors
20th-century Indian male actors
Indian male film actors
Loyola College, Chennai alumni
Male actors in Tamil cinema
Male actors from Chennai
Tamil male actors
Indian Tamil people
Tamil Nadu State Film Awards winners
Tamil playback singers
Recipients of the Kalaimamani Award
Indian male child actors
Indian film choreographers